TVCaricuao is a Venezuelan community television channel.  It was created in November 2002 and can be seen in the community of Caricuao in the Libertador Municipality of the Capital District of Venezuela on UHF channel 66.  Maria de Stefano R. and Lenin Bordones are the legal representative of the foundation that owns this channel.

See also
List of Venezuelan television channels

Television networks in Venezuela
Television stations in Venezuela
Television channels and stations established in 2002
2002 establishments in Venezuela